Placospongiidae is a family of sponges belonging to the order Clionaida.

Genera:
 Onotoa Laubenfels, 1955
 Placospherastra van Soest, 2009
 Placospongia Gray, 1867

References

Sponge families